The Zanj Rebellion was a major revolt against the Abbasid Caliphate, which took place from 869 until 883. Begun near the city of Basra in present-day southern Iraq and led by one Ali ibn Muhammad, the insurrection involved enslaved Bantu-speaking people (Zanj) who had originally been captured from the coast of Southeast Africa and transported to the Middle East, principally to drain the region's salt marshes. It grew to involve slaves and freemen, including both Southeastern Africans and Arabs, from several regions of the Caliphate, and claimed tens of thousands of lives before it was finally defeated.

Several Muslim historians, such as al-Tabari and al-Mas'udi, consider the Zanj revolt to be one of the "most vicious and brutal uprisings" of the many disturbances that plagued the Abbasid central government. Modern scholars have characterized the conflict as being "one of the bloodiest and most destructive rebellions which the history of Western Asia records," while at the same time praising its coverage as being among the "most fully and extensively described campaign[s] in the whole of early Islamic historical writing." The precise composition of the rebels remains a subject of debate, both as regards their identity and as to the proportion of slaves and free among them – available historical sources being open to various interpretations.

Background

The Zanj were Bantu-speaking people who had been forcibly taken from Southeast Africa and were enslaved primarily for agricultural labor as part of the plantation economy of southern Iraq. The demand for servile labor during this period was fueled by wealthy residents of the port city of Basra, who had acquired extensive marshlands in the surrounding region. These lands had been abandoned as a result of peasant migration and repeated flooding over time, but they could be converted back into cultivatable status through intensive labor.

Local magnates were able to gain ownership of this land on the condition that they would make it arable. As a result, they acquired large numbers of Zanj and other slaves, who were placed into work camps and tasked with clearing away the nitrous topsoil as part of the reclamation process. Other Zanj were used to work in the salt flats of lower Iraq, especially in the area around Basra.

Both the working and living conditions of the Zanj were considered to be extremely miserable. The menial labor they were engaged in was difficult and the slaves appear to have been poorly treated by their masters. Two previous attempts to rebel against these circumstances are known to have occurred in 689–90 and in 694. Both of these revolts had quickly failed and thereafter little is known about their history prior to 869.

Beginning in 861, the Abbasid Caliphate was weakened by a period of severe disorder known as the Anarchy at Samarra, during which the central government in Abbasid Samarra was paralyzed by a struggle between the caliphs and the military establishment for control of the state. Throughout the 860s the various factions in the capital were distracted by this conflict, which resulted in the deaths of several caliphs, army commanders and bureaucrats, the outbreak of multiple troop riots, a damaging civil war in 865–866, and the virtual bankruptcy of the government.

The anarchy in Samarra allowed a number of provinces to fall into the hands of rebels, while provincial governors were free to act in an independent manner in the territories assigned to them. The effective loss of provinces, in turn, resulted in a decrease in taxation revenues received by the central government, further exacerbating the crisis in the capital and crippling the government's ability to effectively respond to challenges against its authority. This continuing instability greatly facilitated the initial success of the Zanj revolt, as the government proved incapable of committing sufficient troops and resources to subdue the rebels.

Ali ibn Muhammad

The leader of the revolt was Ali ibn Muhammad, an individual of uncertain background. Little is known about his family or early life due to a scarcity of information and conflicting accounts. According to one version, his paternal grandfather was descended from the Abd al-Qays and his mother was a member of  Banu Asad ibn Khuzaymah. Some later commentators have presumed him to have been of Persian rather than Arab background, but other historians consider this to be unlikely. Ali himself claimed to have been descended from Ali ibn Abi Talib, the son-in-law of the Islamic prophet Muhammad and fourth caliph of the Rashidun Caliphate, but this was largely rejected by Muslim historians of the era as false.

Regardless of his origins, Ali appears to have spent at least a part of his youth living in the area of Rayy, and at an unspecified date he moved to the Abbasid capital of Samarra, where he mixed with some of the influential slaves of Caliph al-Muntasir (r. 861–862). In 863, he made his way from Samarra to Bahrain (modern eastern Arabia), where he pretended to be Shi'i and started to rouse the people into rebellion against the caliphate. Support for his cause quickly grew. A large number of Bahranis submitted to his authority and the kharaj (land taxes) were collected in his name. Despite this, his rebellion eventually failed due to opposition from the local inhabitants, whereupon Ali abandoned the region and relocated to the city of Basra in southern Iraq in 868.

In Basra, Ali sought to take advantage of disturbances caused by the city's rival groups, the Bilaliyyah and Sa'diyyah, and attempted to secure the support of one of the factions. Eventually he proclaimed a new revolt, but no one in the city rallied to his side and he was forced to flee to the marshlands of southern Iraq. There he was arrested by the provincial authorities and sent to Wasit. He was quickly able to secure his freedom and went to Baghdad, where he remained for the next year. During his time in Baghdad he claimed to be a Zaydi by being related to the grandson of Zayd ibn Ali and won over additional followers for his movement.

When Ali heard news about another scuffle between Basra's factions in 869, he returned to the region and "began to seek out black slaves working in the Basra marshes and to inquire into their working conditions and nutritional standards." He began a campaign to liberate and recruit Zanj and other slaves, promising them wealth, affluence and prosperity in exchange for their support. A  trifling number of people quickly joined his cause, and Ali soon came to be known by the title Sāhib az-Zanj, meaning "Chief of the Zanj". However, Ali's movement attracted not only Zanj but many other people of different social groups. These included "semi-liberated slaves, clients of prestigious families, a number of small craftsmen and humble workers, some peasantry and some Bedouin peoples who lived around Basrah."

While he was gaining followers for his rebellion, Ali adopted slogans of the egalitarian doctrine of the Kharijites, who "preached that the most qualified man should reign, even if he was an Abyssinian slave." He inscribed his banner and coins with Kharijite expressions and started off his Friday sermons with the slogan "God is great, God is great, there is no God but God, and God is great; there is no arbitration except by God", which was "the war cry used by the Kharijites when they defected from the ranks of Ali ibn Abi Talib during the Battle of Siffin". At the same time, however, Ali did not completely abandon the pretense of being an Alid and maintained the claim that he was a Zaydi.

Revolt

The revolt, which began in September 869, was concentrated in the districts of Iraq and al-Ahwaz (modern Khuzestan Province) in the central regions of the Abbasid Caliphate. Over the course of the next fourteen years, the Zanj were able to combat the superior arms of the Abbasid government by waging guerrilla warfare against their opponents. They became adept at raiding towns, villages and enemy camps (often at night), seizing weapons, horses, food and captives and freeing fellow slaves, and burning the rest to cinders to delay retaliation. As the rebellion grew in strength, they also constructed fortresses, built up a navy for traversing the canals and rivers of the region, collected taxes in territories under their control, and minted their own coins.

In its initial stages, the rebellion was limited to the region around the city of Basra and the Blind Tigris. Early efforts by the Abbasid government to crush the revolt proved ineffectual, and several towns and villages were occupied or sacked, including al-Ubulla in 870 and Suq al-Ahwaz in 871. Basra fell in September 871 following an extended blockade, resulting in the city being burned and its inhabitants massacred. A retaliatory campaign undertaken by the caliphal regent Abu Ahmad ibn al-Mutawakkil (known by his honorific of al-Muwaffaq) against the rebels in 872 ended in failure, and the Zanj remained on the offensive over the next several years.

The continuing inability of the Abbasid army to suppress the revolt, caused in part by its preoccupation with fighting against the Saffarid Ya'qub ibn al-Layth's advance into al-Ahwaz and Iraq, eventually encouraged the Zanj to expand their activities to the north. A campaign by the rebels to occupy the marshlands between Basra and Wasit in 876 proved successful, and soon they made their way into the district of Kaskar. By 879, the rebellion reached its furthest extent. Wasit and Ramhurmuz were sacked and the rebels advanced northwest along the Tigris, coming to within fifty miles of Baghdad.

The Abbasid government regained the initiative in the war in late 879, when al-Muwaffaq sent his son Abu al-'Abbas (the future caliph al-Mu'tadid) with a major force against the rebels. Al-Muwaffaq himself joined the offensive in the following year, and over the next several months the government forces succeeded in clearing the rebels out of the districts of Iraq and al-Ahwaz and driving them back toward their "capital" of al-Mukhtarah, to the south of Basra.

Al-Mukhtarah was placed under siege in February 881, and over the next two and half years a policy by al-Muwaffaq of offering generous terms to anyone that voluntarily submitted convinced many of the rebels to abandon the struggle. The fall of al-Mukhtarah in August 883, combined with the death or capture of Ali ibn Muhammad and most of the rebel commanders, brought the revolt to an end, and the remaining rebels either surrendered to the government or were killed.

Consequences
The number of people killed in the conflict is difficult to estimate; contemporary writers gave widely variable figures, and these are considered by modern historians to be gross exaggerations. Al-Mas'udi reported a "moderate" estimate of 500,000 casualties – though he added a clarification that this was "empty conjecture - rigorous calculation [of the amount slain] is impossible" – and separately noted that 300,000 were killed at the Battle of Basra. Al-Suli gave a figure of 1,500,000 dead, which was subsequently quoted by multiple sources, while Ibn al-Taqtaqi provided a high-end number of 2,500,000. Al-Tabari's History contains no comprehensive figures, but the author frequently noted the number of soldiers killed or injured in individual battles, with amounts ranging from hundreds to thousands.

The rebellion greatly disrupted economic activity and caused extensive damage to the districts it took place in. Sources of the revolt describe burnt cities and towns, the seizure of food and other resources by advancing armies, the abandonment of lands and the cessation of agricultural activity, disruptions in the regional trade, and the damaging of bridges and canals in the name of military exigency. Shortages of basic necessities, such as food and water, at times became severe, and instances of cannibalism are reported to have occurred.

Both the rebels and their opponents engaged in looting, destroying supplies that were likely to fall into enemy hands, and massacring or executing captives. The long term effects of the revolt, on the other hand, are more difficult to ascertain and opinions by modern historians vary; some like Bernard Lewis believe that the rebellion resulted in no significant changes, while others such as Theodor Nöldeke argue that the regions devastated by the conflict never fully recovered afterward.

The significant arms and resources that the Abbasid government was required to throw against the Zanj meant that it was forced to divert its attention from other fronts for the duration of the conflict, resulting in the effective loss of several provinces. Ahmad ibn Tulun, the Tulunid governor of Egypt, was able to take advantage of the Abbasids' preoccupation with the Zanj and forge a de facto independent state which would survive for more than three decades, while the Saffarids Ya'qub ibn al-Layth and Amr ibn al-Layth seized several of the eastern provinces and faced no serious opposition from the central government until Ya'qub's attempt to march on Iraq itself in 876. The revolt may have also affected the government's ability to defend against the Byzantines, who scored several successes on the Anatolian frontier during this period, and possibly even indirectly contributed to the rise of the Qarmatians of Bahrain a few years later.

Historiography

Ghada Hashem Talhami, a scholar of the Zanj rebellion, argues that modern views of the revolt are distorted by mistakenly equating the Zanj with East Africans. The assumption that Abbasid writers exclusively used the term "Zanj" to mean specifically the East African coast, and that therefore the people they called Zanj originated from a specific part of that region, is unsupported by contemporary sources due to their silence on the existence of an East African slave trade in this period, as well as by their occasional use of the term to mean "blacks" or "Africa" in general.

Talhami cites from various historians and works to make her point that the rebellion was more of a religious/social uprising made by the lowly classed and suppressed citizens of the Basra area, which included a wide variety of people, including slaves of indeterminate origin. She points out that the sources specifically state that the people referred to as "Zanj" were not the only participants of the revolt, but were joined by Bahranis, Bedouins and others from the Basra region; moreover, they give no explicit indication that the Zanj even constituted a majority of the rebels.

Historian M. A. Shaban has argued that the rebellion was not a slave revolt, but a revolt of blacks (zanj). In his opinion, although a few runaway slaves did join the revolt, the majority of the participants were Arabs and free East Africans, and if the revolt had been led by slaves, they would have lacked the necessary resources to combat the Abbasid government for as long as they did.

Sources of information
Much of the current knowledge of the Zanj Rebellion comes from the historian al-Tabari's work History of the Prophets and Kings. It has been the subject of research by such famous Orientalists as Theodor Nöldeke (Sketches from Eastern History) and Louis Massignon (The Passion of al-Hallaj). Alexandre Popović has authored a more recent monograph on the subject.

See also
Al-Mu'tamid, Abbasid caliph (r. 870–892) during Zanj Rebellion.
Afro-Iraqi
Battle of Basra (871)

References

Citations

Sources

External links
 The Largest African Slave Revolt
 Zapping the Zanj: Towards a History of the Zanj Slaves' Rebellion

 
9th-century rebellions
Islam and slavery
Iraq under the Abbasid Caliphate
9th century in the Abbasid Caliphate
Slavery in the Abbasid Caliphate
Slave rebellions